What Price Beauty? is a 1928 American silent drama film directed by Tom Buckingham and starring Nita Naldi, Natacha Rambova and Pierre Gendron. Shot in May 1925 but not released until January 1928, the film features the future star Myrna Loy in a small role. Her performance attracted widespread interest, boosting her career.

The film's sets were designed by the art director William Cameron Menzies.

Plot
An exotic vamp and a nice country girl compete over the manager of a beauty parlour.

Cast

References

Sources
Emily W. Leider. Myrna Loy: The Only Good Girl in Hollywood. University of California Press, 2011.

External links

1928 films
1928 drama films
Silent American drama films
Films directed by Tom Buckingham
American silent feature films
1920s English-language films
American black-and-white films
1920s American films